Bruno Chimirri (born 13 November 1971) is an Italian equestrian. He competed in two events at the 2004 Summer Olympics.

References

External links
 

1971 births
Living people
Italian male equestrians
Olympic equestrians of Italy
Equestrians at the 2004 Summer Olympics
People from Catanzaro
Sportspeople from the Province of Catanzaro